The second season of the American science fiction television series Fringe commenced airing on the Fox network on September 17, 2009, and concluded on May 20, 2010. The season was produced by Bad Robot Productions in association with Warner Bros. Television, and its showrunners were Jeff Pinkner and J. H. Wyman. Actors Anna Torv, John Noble, and Joshua Jackson reprised their roles as FBI agent Olivia Dunham and father-son duo Walter and Peter Bishop, respectively. Previous series regulars Lance Reddick, Jasika Nicole, Blair Brown, and Kirk Acevedo also returned, though with Acevedo in a limited capacity. 

The season followed the continuation of a war between two universes, the prime and the parallel. It was set in the former, until the last several episodes when Peter Bishop (Jackson) journeyed back to the parallel universe after being lured there by his real father, "Walternate" (Noble). While co-creator J. J. Abrams described the first season as "identifying that there is an enemy", he referred to season two as "getting to know the enemy" as it "build[s] to a very specific type of confrontation" between the two universes. The writers focused on their characters' development, in particular making them more comfortable with each other while solving cases for Fringe Division. By inventing the "mythalone" style of episode, the producers sought to create the perfect episode that mixed standalone episode qualities for casual viewers with the further development of the series' mythology for regular viewers.

In a departure from the previous season, the second season aired in a new competitive timeslot at 9:00 pm on Thursdays. It contained 22 episodes, plus an unaired episode that was produced during the first season; "Unearthed" aired as a special as episode 11 of season two, days prior to "Johari Window", the first new episode of 2010. Also part of the season was the series' only musical episode, "Brown Betty", which was produced at the request of the network. The season finale, "Over There", fully introduced the parallel universe and laid the groundwork for the third season.

Fringe ended its second season with a per episode average of 6.252 million total viewers and a 2.3 ratings share in the 18–49 demographic. The season was generally well-received by critics, though most agreed that the second half was a considerable improvement over the first. The series was chosen for a number of 2010 "best of television" lists, including The New York Times, the Seattle Post-Intelligencer, and Entertainment Weekly. Despite its critical acclaim, Fringe failed to earn any major category nominations at the 62nd Primetime Emmy Awards, but did receive nominations at the Creative Arts Emmy Awards, Golden Reel Awards, and Satellite Awards; at the Saturn Awards, Torv and guest actor Leonard Nimoy won in their respective categories. The second season was released on DVD and Blu-ray in region 1 on September 14, 2010, in region 2 on September 27, and in region 4 on November 10.

Season summary 
Olivia, having been taken to William Bell's office in the parallel universe, is returned to the prime universe but with short term amnesia, unable to recall her experience there. Massive Dynamic's Nina Sharp directs her to Sam Weiss, a bowling alley manager, who gives her cryptic but helpful advice to overcome her amnesia. Meanwhile, the Fringe division has discovered several shapeshifters - a human/machine hybrid that bleed mercury - have crossed over, but unbeknownst to them, one takes the form of Olivia's partner, Charlie. When Sam's advice allows Olivia to recall what Bell told her, she unwittingly gives this information to the shapeshifter, who calls its agents to use the information to recover the body of Thomas Jerome Newton, an agent for some entity operating from the parallel universe. Nina provides Olivia with cautionary advice, alerting her to a "great war" that Bell postulated would occur between the two universes. During this time, Peter has come to forgive Walter for his past, and Walter has grown accustomed to normal life outside of the institution, but is still troubled by a secret.

Newton, using old technology from Walter and Bell's research, is able to pull an entire building from the parallel universe to the prime, and the team races against time to prevent harm when, due to the laws of mass conservation, a building from the prime is pulled to the parallel one. This event forces Walter to try to coax Olivia to recall her Cortexiphan abilities as to identify things affected by the parallel universe. Initially unable to do so, her fear of failure enables her ability, allowing them to save the people within the target building, but also revealing to her that Peter is from the parallel universe. Walter explains to Olivia that in 1985, he and Bell had devised a way to observe the parallel universe, where he found his doppelgänger, "Walternate", was also close to losing his son. Though Walter's Peter had died, Walternate continued to search for a cure, but missed the telltale sign when the Observer September arrived at his lab. Walter resynthesized the cure and aimed to cross over using untested equipment at Reiden Lake, though stalled by Nina and his lab assistant Clara. Nina tackled him on his way over, losing her arm in the process, while Walter, on the other side, found the cure vial broken. Intent on curing the alternate Peter, he posed as his father and crossed back with Peter, intending to administer the cure at the lab and then return Peter. However, on the return, the ice on Reiden Lake broke, threatening to drown both, but they were saved by September, who cautioned Walter "the boy must live". While Walter successfully administered the cure, his wife Elizabeth saw Peter, and Walter realized he could never return Peter to the parallel universe. After Walter reveals this truth, he considers letting Peter know but struggles with how to do so, hoping to seek repentance from God for his actions.

Meanwhile, Newton has continued to use Walter's technology to bring into temporary existence elements from the parallel universe. This enables Newton and his agents to bring over a figure known as "Mr. Secretary", despite Fringe's attempts to stop them. Peter, from this action, deduces that he is from the parallel universe, and furious at Walter for hiding this information, leaves on his own. While hiding in the Pacific Northwest, Peter meets Mr. Secretary - Walternate, his true father, who offers to take him back to the parallel universe, which Peter accepts. Olivia and Walter are alerted by September that Walternate plans to use Peter to initiate the operation of a strange device that threatens to destroy the prime universe, and the two launch a rescue attempt. In the parallel universe, they find that it suffers from singularities caused by Walter's crossing in 1985, forcing Walternate's Fringe team to use an amber-like substance to surround and quarantine such areas, regardless of innocent lives trapped within. They meet with William Bell, and Walter and Bell resolve their past differences. Olivia faces off against her doppelgänger, "Fauxlivia", who works for Walternate in the Fringe Division under the U.S. Secretary of Defense; she is able to recover Peter, who has seen the device and recognized that it reacted only to his biology, and wants nothing of it, willing to return with the others. As Olivia, Walter, and Peter attempt to return, they are engaged by Fauxlivia and others in the Fringe Division. Bell sacrifices himself to provide energy into a device to allow the three to cross over, but none of them are aware that Fauxlivia has secretly switched places with Olivia under Walternate's orders, while Olivia is captured and held in a secured facility by Walternate.

Episodes

Development

Crew

The season was produced by Bad Robot Productions in association with Warner Bros. Television. Though still set in Boston, the show's production for the second season moved from New York City to Vancouver out of financial necessity, as it lost access to New York's TV production tax incentive program. Fringe consequently got a mostly new writing staff and production team, though co-creators J. J. Abrams, Roberto Orci, and Alex Kurtzman, and producer Bryan Burk remained involved with the series. Jeff Pinkner and J.H. Wyman returned as executive producers and showrunners. Jeff Vlaming and previous episode director Akiva Goldsman joined the crew as consulting producers. While Abrams had six episode writing credits for the first season he remained much more hands-off for the second, instead focusing on other commitments like the film Star Trek. He explained, "Sometimes we'll talk every day. Then there will be a period of a couple weeks where we don't speak. But we're emailing a lot. There's a lot of stuff that happens that way."  Eden FX and Zoic Studios stayed as vendors for the series' visual effects, effectively giving Fringe a sense of continuity. Jay Worth, the overall visual effects supervisor, commented that having these two companies "helped the show not feel as a big of a bump from one season to the next, particularly with different crews and a different vibe a little bit." Despite his decreased involvement, Abrams was sent all of the visual effects for the series during production, and responded back with notes and tweaks.

Writing and filming
Responding to criticism that some first season episodes were too neatly wrapped and solved, Jeff Pinkner commented towards the end of that season, "We found that, absolutely, early on, we were falling into the trap of—the tease would be fantastic. And then we would too quickly answer it and [reduce] the tension. And we've tried to course-correct and have the tease promise" questions that don't get answered right away. He further elaborated that the goal now is to "have the energy of the show get bigger as [an episode] goes along... We're learning how to tell this version of a detective story. It's not really a police procedural. There are elements of that. But it's an incredible mish-mash of genres. I think we're getting better at finding our way through these stories."

Pinkner, Abrams, Orci, Burk, Kurtzman, Wyman, and Goldsman developed the second season's storyline together. Goldsman explained that they "mapped" out the season "in a way that we remained fundamentally faithful to". Though they changed certain aspects, they knew where Olivia and Peter were going to start and end up but "got there at different paces than what [they] originally planned". While the first season both focused on Olivia and dealt with discovering the existence of an enemy, the second was designed to "[build] to a very specific type of confrontation" between the two universes. Explained Pinkner, "Season 2 is about the people from 'over there' putting the final pieces of the invasion into play, and explaining why". At the same time, the producers approached the second season as a "journey of self-actualization" and "maturation for our characters." They wanted to make the three main cast members become more comfortable as a team in Fringe Division; Peter thus was written to be more heroic and to go from reluctance to a desire to help his father, while Walter became gradually more independent and "grounded as a human being". They made the secret of Peter's origins one of the main story focuses of the season. While the audience had been made aware of Walter's secret in the season one finale, the producers wanted to "acknowledge it to our characters". All the while Walter was "suffering... and desperately trying to keep it all quiet", Olivia and Peter grew closer to the truth. By "giv[ing] these things time" to develop, Pinkner strove to avoid focusing just on "event, event, event", instead concentrating on the real consequences of Peter and Olivia's eventual discovery.

The second season's mythology was intended to be revealed in small parcels. Throughout the season, Pinkner and Wyman tried to create an episode that best bridged "standalone" traits—needed for casual viewers—with the further advancement of the show's mythology for those who watched regularly. At the start of the season Pinkner believed they had found a "good rhythm" between the two, as the mythology "really [started to] affect the characters, to the point where even the standalone [episodes] advance mythology". After the season ended, Wyman commented at San Diego Comic-Con International, "We learned that the fan fans love mythology but there are needs from the networks. We started experimenting with a thing we called 'mythalones', not standalone or myth." Wyman cited the season's 18th episode, "White Tulip" as a prime example, noting "You can see that you're following Walter's journey, it's the right mix." The Fringe producers strove to avoid becoming bogged down in mythology, an issue that they perceived happened in Alias, another J. J. Abrams television series. In a joint statement released midway through the season, Abrams, Pinkner, and Wyman noted that their "only internal rule is that we make every effort to not raise mythological questions merely to string viewers along, but rather to provide answers that generate consequences."

At Fox's request, the writers developed a musical episode, "Brown Betty" to fit into the network's "Fox rocks" campaign in the same vein as its series Glee. While the episode already had most of the necessary elements in place before Fox's request, the producers were able to add the musical theme as a "narrative device" to "explore Walter's feelings" in the aftermath of Peter's discovery and flight. To prepare for the season finale, the producers began developing characteristics of the parallel universe relatively early on. Relating to the two universes' idiosyncrasies, Pinkner and Wyman were both interested in world building and "the concept of choices", such as the differing events that led to the Other Side possessing a still-standing World Trade Center but destroyed White House. Other historical idiosyncrasies included the oxidation of the Statue of Liberty and the use of zeppelins as transportation. They believed that all of their additions were "the texture that actually makes it a world. The richness of detail is what makes it feel real".

As the series began filming in Vancouver, the University of British Columbia campus served as a substitute for Harvard University. Because of its heritage buildings and antique storefronts, many of the scenes set in the alternate universe were shot in New Westminster, an area outside Vancouver. Consulting producer and previous Fringe director Akiva Goldsman returned to direct several episodes, as did producer Brad Anderson, executive producer Joe Chappelle, and producer Paul Edwards. One time guest directors for the season included Bryan Spicer, Jon Cassar, Dennis Smith, Paul Holahan, Jeannot Szwarc, Frederick E. O. Toye, Deran Sarafian, Adam Davidson, Charles Beeson, David Straiton, Thomas Yatsko, Jeffrey Hunt, and Seith Mann.

Cast

Main cast 
As with the previous season, the second season featured three main characters all working together to solve various Fringe cases. Anna Torv played determined FBI agent Olivia Dunham, who is able to travel between universes as a result of childhood experiments performed on her with the nootropic drug, Cortexiphan. The man responsible for these experiments, Dr. Walter Bishop, was played by John Noble. Walter's son Peter Bishop, whom he stole from the parallel universe, was portrayed by Joshua Jackson. Other members of the main cast included Jasika Nicole as Junior FBI Agent and Walter's lab assistant Astrid Farnsworth, Lance Reddick as Agent Phillip Broyles, Blair Brown as Massive Dynamic executive Nina Sharp, and Kirk Acevedo as Agent Charlie Francis. Acevedo's character was killed off in the season's fourth episode, though at the time Pinkner and Wyman hinted of the actor's possible return later in the season. Acevedo returned to guest star in the season finale as the parallel universe version of Charlie Francis. Acevedo was also featured in "Unearthed", a special episode that was filmed during the first season, but aired as the eleventh episode of the second season.

Recurring cast 
The second season marked a large number of recurring guest appearances. Michael Cerveris played September/The Observer, a mysterious man that observes important events and appeared in every episode of the season, often merely in brief glimpses. Further Observers were revealed, including August (Peter Woodward) and December (Eugene Lipinski). Ryan McDonald portrayed Massive Dynamic scientist Brandon Fayette, while its founder, Dr. William Bell was played by Leonard Nimoy, despite the actor's recent retirement. Thomas Jerome Newton, one of the season's main villains, was played by Sebastian Roché. Kevin Corrigan portrayed Samuel Weiss, a mysterious man who helps Olivia recover from her injuries. Ari Graynor appeared as Olivia's sister Rachel Dunham, while Lily Pilblad played Rachel's daughter and Olivia's niece Ella Blake. Orla Brady played Walter's wife Elizabeth Bishop. A new FBI agent, Amy Jessup, was portrayed by Meghan Markle. Roger Cross appeared as a shapeshifter. Former Cortexiphan subjects James Heath and Nick Lane were played by Omar Metwally and David Call, respectively. Karen Holness appeared as Broyles' ex-wife Diane, and Clark Middleton played rare book seller Edward Markham. Philip Winchester appeared as Fauxlivia's boyfriend Frank Stanton, while Seth Gabel played Agent Lincoln Lee from the parallel universe, both in the finale. J. R. Bourne played Agent Edwards, and Gerard Plunkett appeared as Senator James Van Horn.

Further notable guest stars included Andrew Airlie, Stefan Arngrim, Demore Barnes, Jenni Blong, Pascale Hutton, Ravil Isyanov, Ravi Kapoor, Alice Kremelberg, Diane Kruger, Quinn Lord, Tzi Ma, Stephen McHattie, Jennifer Missoni, Cameron Monaghan, Michael O'Neill, Geoff Pierson, Martha Plimpton, Paul Rae, John Savage, Peter Weller, and Craig Robert Young.

Reception

Ratings and broadcast
Fringe first season ended with an average of 9.96 million viewers, and among the season's new series, it was the first rated show for adults 18–49. On May 4, 2009, a week before the season one finale, Fox renewed Fringe for a second season, giving it a full season pick-up of 22 episodes. The network's president of entertainment, Kevin Reilly, explained "Fringe proved to be a notable addition to our schedule all season and it really has fans buzzing as it builds to a fantastic season finale."

Later in May, Fox announced Fringe would be moving from Tuesdays to Thursdays for the second season, to be aired in the competitive 9:00 pm timeslot. Kevin Reilly explained the move, "The door is more open on this night than it has been in a long time. Fringe is a real alternative to both [Grey's and CSI: Crime Scene Investigation]." However, after a perceived "healthy" first season, the second season premiere was watched by an estimated 7.817 million viewers. Ratings for the season continued to decline, culminating in 5.68 million viewers watching the finale. Fringes second season ended with an average of 6.252 million viewers per episode and a 2.3 ratings share for adults 18–49, causing the series to finish in 79th place out of all the season's network television shows. However, Fringe and its lead-in, Bones, did help the network increase 52% among adults aged 18–49 and 65 percent among total viewers from the same night the previous year. Despite its middling ratings, Fringe received a full-season renewal on March 6, 2010.

Reviews
The second season of Fringe received generally very favorable reviews. At the beginning of the season, the series was featured on the September 18 cover of Entertainment Weekly, which promised to give readers a "deep dive into the gory, witty world of Fox's Fringe. On Rotten Tomatoes, the season has an approval rating of 81% with an average score of 8.2 out of 10 based on 16 reviews. The website's critical consensus reads, "Fringe surpasses expectations in season two with stronger character development while maintaining its creepy sci-fi angle." Metacritic, a review aggregate website, gave the second season 75/100 based upon ten reviews, indicating a "generally favorable" reception. After viewing the first eight episodes, Entertainment Weekly columnist Ken Tucker gave the series an A−, calling it "one of the fastest, smartest, wittiest shows on television now... Fringe successfully mixes the crime genre with sci-fi, and cold conspiracies with heartfelt emotion." Peter Swanson from Slant Magazine gave Fringe two and a half stars after watching the first six episodes. He believed the second season had "floundered a little, stuck in that creative hinterland between the desire to grab new viewers and the need to build on the mythology of the show's universe." While Swanson understood the need to attract a larger audience, he thought the standalone episodes to be "less than stellar", as "they've yet to get scary, or even vaguely unsettling". Swanson did however find the war between two universes to be "particularly compelling", and expressed hope that "Fringe [would] find its footing."

In a review of the entire second season, IGN believed that despite the premiere's "great start", the first half contained "some rather lackluster episodes" that "made a lot of fans worried and got the rumors of cancellation circulating"; the second half however "showed that Fringe is still one of the best sci-fi series on TV". The A.V. Club agreed, and called the first half "entertaining" but "never essential" while noting a great improvement mid-way through the season, as "the show finally grounded its freak-of-the-week weirdness in deep sadness". The A.V. Club continued, "...The season-two episode "Peter" finally dramatized the moment that changed [Peter's] life, giving the series' overarching storyline a devastating emotional core, based in a father's love instead of in theoretical concepts. It only got better from there, as the series expanded its world by further making those concepts concrete. Fringe is that rare blend of inventive ideas, wild ambition, and unexpected soulfulness." The Seattle Post-Intelligencer believed that by the end of the season "Fringe had truly found its footing, doing daring, experimental episodes like the musical "Brown Betty"... and heartbreaking stand alone episodes, like "White Tulip", (which might be my favorite hour of television this year that wasn't Lost-related)."

In particular, critics highlighted the season premiere "A New Day in the Old Town" as well as regular episodes "Peter" and "White Tulip", and the season finale "Over There". The main three cast members' performances were praised, and various critics noted the series continued the sense of humor seen in the first season. Fringes second season was chosen for a number of 2010 "best of television" lists, including The New York Times, Entertainment Weekly, Digital Spy, the New York Post, The Daily Beast, the Seattle Post-Intelligencer, AOL's TV Squad, as well as IGN, which named Fringe the best sci-fi series of 2010, beating fellow nominees Lost, Caprica, and Stargate Universe.

Awards and nominations

At the 62nd Primetime Emmy Awards, actor Joshua Jackson and actress Anna Torv submitted their work in the second season for consideration in the Outstanding Lead Actor in a Drama Series and Outstanding Lead Actress in a Drama Series categories, respectively. Actors John Noble, Lance Reddick, Kirk Acevedo, and actress Blair Brown submitted their work for consideration in the Outstanding Supporting Actor in a Drama Series and Outstanding Supporting Actress in a Drama Series categories, respectively. The second season of Fringe was submitted for consideration in the Outstanding Drama Series category but failed to garner a nomination. The failure of the series to garner any major category nominations at the Emmys was perceived as a notable snub by many media outlets. 

The second season received nominations for Sound Editing at the Creative Arts Emmy Awards and at the Golden Reel Awards. The season's sole musical episode, "Brown Betty", received a nomination for Short Form Musical In Television at the Golden Reel Awards. Noble, Torv, and guest actor Leonard Nimoy were nominated at the 2010 Saturn Awards, with Torv and Nimoy winning in their respective categories. Noble also received a nomination at the 2010 Satellite Awards, but lost to Dexters John Lithgow.

Home video releases 
The second season of Fringe was released on DVD and Blu-ray in region 1 on September 14, 2010, in region 2 on September 27, 2010 and in region 4 on November 10, 2010. The sets includes all 22 episodes (plus an unaired episode) of season two on a 6-disc DVD set and a 4-disc Blu-ray set presented in anamorphic widescreen. Special features on the sets include four commentary tracks—"Momentum Deferred" with Jill Risk, Matthew Pitts, Danielle Dispaltro, Justin Doble and Charles Scott IV; "Peter" with John Noble, Blair Brown and Damian Holbrook; "Brown Betty" with Tanya Swerling, Billy Gottlieb, Chris Tilton and Jay Worth; and "Over There, Part 2" with Jeff Pinkner, J. H. Wyman and Akiva Goldsman. Episodic behind-the-scene featurettes include "Analyzing the Scene" on six episodes, "Dissected Files: Unaired Scenes" on select episodes and "Unusual Side Effects: Gag Reel". Other featurettes include "In the Lab with John Noble and Prop Master Rob Smith" and "Beyond the Pattern: The Mythology of Fringe". The unaired episode from season one, "Unearthed", is presented as a special feature, separate from the other episodes.

Notes

References

External links 

 
 

2
2009 American television seasons
2010 American television seasons